Allan McGowan (7 August 1926 − 4 October 2019) was an Australian rules footballer who played for the Melbourne Football Club and Collingwood Football Club in the Victorian Football League (VFL).

Notes

External links 

Collingwood Forever

1926 births
2019 deaths
Australian rules footballers from South Australia
Melbourne Football Club players
Collingwood Football Club players
Glenelg Football Club players